Hervé Balland (born January 7, 1964) is a French cross-country skier who competed from 1990 to 1998. He won a silver medal in the 50 km event at the 1993 FIS Nordic World Ski Championships in Falun.

Balland's best finish at the Winter Olympics was a fifth in the 50 km event at the 1992 Games in Albertville. He won the Engadin Skimarathon in 1993, 1994 and 1996, and a 15 km event in Germany in 1994.

Cross-country skiing results
All results are sourced from the International Ski Federation (FIS).

Olympic Games

World Championships
 1 medal – (1 silver)

World Cup

Season standings

Individual podiums

 2 podiums

Note:  Until the 1999 World Championships, World Championship races were included in the World Cup scoring system.

References

External links

Olympic 4 x 10 km relay results: 1936-2002 

1964 births
Cross-country skiers at the 1992 Winter Olympics
Cross-country skiers at the 1994 Winter Olympics
Cross-country skiers at the 1998 Winter Olympics
French male cross-country skiers
Living people
FIS Nordic World Ski Championships medalists in cross-country skiing
Olympic cross-country skiers of France
20th-century French people